Job 38 is the 38th chapter of the Book of Job in the Hebrew Bible or the Old Testament of the Christian Bible. The book is anonymous; most scholars believe it was written around 6th century BCE. This chapter records the speech of God to Job, which belongs to the "Verdicts" section of the book, comprising Job 32:1–42:6.

Text
The original text is written in Hebrew language. This chapter is divided into 41 verses.

Textual witnesses
Some early manuscripts containing the text of this chapter in Hebrew are of the Masoretic Text, which includes the Aleppo Codex (10th century), and Codex Leningradensis (1008).

There is also a translation into Koine Greek known as the Septuagint, made in the last few centuries BC; some extant ancient manuscripts of this version include Codex Vaticanus (B; B; 4th century), Codex Sinaiticus (S; BHK: S; 4th century), and Codex Alexandrinus (A; A; 5th century).

Analysis
The structure of the book is as follows:
The Prologue (chapters 1–2)
The Dialogue (chapters 3–31)
The Verdicts (32:1–42:6)
The Epilogue (42:7–17)

Within the structure, chapter 38 is grouped into the Verdict section with the following outline:
Elihu's Verdict (32:1–37:24)
God's Appearance (Yahweh Speeches) and Job's Responses (38:1–42:6)
God's First Speech (38:1–40:2)
Theme Verse and Summons (38:1–3)
The Physical World (38:4–38)
The Physical Earth (38:4–7)
The Sea (38:8–11)
The Morning (38:12–15)
The Outer Limits of the Earth (38:16–18)
Light and Darkness (38:19–21)
The Waters – Snow, Hail, Rain, Frost, Ice (38:22–30)
The Heavenly Bodies (38:31–33)
Storms (38:34–38)
The Animal World (38:39–40:2)
God Provides for the Lions and Ravens (38:39–41)
The Mountain Goats (39:1–4)
The Wild Donkey (39:5–8)
The Wild Ox (39:9–12)
The Ostrich (39:13–18)
The Warhorse (39:19–25)
The Hawk and the Eagle (39:26–30)
Brief Challenge to Answer (40:1–2)
Job's First Reply – An Insufficient Response (40:3–5)
God's Second Speech (40:6–41:34)
Job's Second Reply (42:1–6)

God's speeches in chapters 38–41 can be split in two parts, both starting with almost identical phrases and having a similar structure:

The revelation of the Lord to Job is the culmination of the book of Job, that the Lord speaks directly to Job and displays his sovereign power and glory. Job has lived through the suffering—without cursing God, holding his integrity, and nowhere regretted it – but he was unaware of the real reason for his suffering, so God intervenes to resolve the spiritual issues that surfaced. Job was not punished for sin and Job’s suffering had not cut him off from God, now Job sees the end the point that he cannot have the knowledge to make the assessments he made, so it is wiser to bow in submission and adoration of God than to try to judge him.

The first speech focuses on God's design and control of the world (verse 2; in contrast to Job's limited knowledge), whereas the second speech raises the issue of God's justice (verse 8; in contrast to Job seeking to justify himself).

Theme verse and summons (38:1–3)
Verse 1 reintroduces God as YHWH, who speaks out of the whirlwind (different word from Job 37:9). The speech of God starts by asking the question "who?" but it is not meant for Job to identify himself, but rather to explain why Job takes the current stance toward God (verse 2), so despite being considered right, Job's understanding is too limited to see God's purposes.

Verse 1
Then the Lord answered Job out of the whirlwind and said:
Cross reference: Job 40:6
"Whirlwind": or "storm", a common accompaniment for a theophany (cf. Ezekiel 1:4; Nahum 1:3; Zechariah 9:14). It was a sign of the arrival of YHWH before speaking to the people of Israel (Exodus 19:16–20:21). In the early part of the book of Job, a storm caused Job's pain (Job 1:19; 9:17), and now becomes the setting of YHWH's direct communication to Job.

The mysteries of God's physical worlds (38:4–41)
After posing the challenge to Job (38:1-3), God's speech covers the surpassing mysteries of earth and sky beyond Job’s understanding (4-38), and the mysteries of animal and bird life that surpassed Job's understanding (38:39-39:30). The key point here, as introduced by the "who" questions (verses 5–6), is to show how limited Job's knowledge to understand the whole situation. The use of lighthearted (almost comical) illustrations softens God's questioning of Job, that it is not intended to be a strong rebuke to Job, but to open Job's "eyes".

Verse 31
[YHWH said:] "“Can you bind the cluster of the Pleiades,
Or loose the belt of Orion?"
"Pleiades (star cluster)": or "the Seven Stars".

See also

Related Bible parts: Job 1, Job 37, John 1

References

Sources

External links
 Jewish translations:
 Iyov - Job - Chapter 38 (Judaica Press) translation [with Rashi's commentary] at Chabad.org
 Christian translations:
 Online Bible at GospelHall.org (ESV, KJV, Darby, American Standard Version, Bible in Basic English)
 Book of Job Chapter 38. Various versions
  Various versions

38